Cercyra is a genus of triclad flatworms in the tribe Cercyrini of the family Cercyridae.

Species 
 Cercyra hastata Schmidt, 1862
 Cercyra teissieri Steinmann, 1930

References

External links 

 

Maricola